John Fitzgerald Booty (born October 9, 1965) is a former American football defensive back in the National Football League (NFL) for the New York Jets, the Philadelphia Eagles, the Phoenix Cardinals, the New York Giants, and the Tampa Bay Buccaneers.  He played college football at Texas Christian University and was drafted in the tenth round of the 1988 NFL Draft.

In 1995 Booty caught a 48-yard touchdown pass from punter Reggie Roby while playing for the Buccaneers.

1965 births
Living people
People from Panola County, Texas
American football defensive backs
TCU Horned Frogs football players
New York Jets players
Philadelphia Eagles players
Phoenix Cardinals players
New York Giants players
Tampa Bay Buccaneers players